The University of Edinburgh School of Literatures, Languages and Cultures is a school within the College of Humanities and Social Science at the University of Edinburgh. The School was formed in 2002 as a result of administrative restructuring, when several departments of what was then the Faculty of Arts were brought together.

The School currently covers seven major subject areas:
 Asian Studies (Chinese, Japanese and Sanskrit)
 Celtic and Scottish Studies
 English Literature 
 European Languages and Cultures (French, German, Hispanic Studies, Italian, Russian and Scandinavian Studies)
 Film studies
 Islamic studies and Middle Eastern Studies
 Theatre Studies

Translation Studies
Founded in 1762 when King George III appointed the Reverend Hugh Blair as the first Regius Professor of Rhetoric and Belles-Lettres, the English Literature department is the oldest centre for the study of Literature in the UK, and one of the oldest in the world.

The college also includes a sizeable Graduate School which includes Masters and PhDs in Film Studies, Theatre Studies, Translation Studies, Cultural Studies and other subjects. The School also supports interdisciplinary research areas such as Word and Music Studies.

References

External links 
 School of Literatures, Languages and Cultures

Literatures, Languages and Cultures
Schools of the University of Edinburgh